Manyluak Aguek (born 8 February 2000), is an Australian professional soccer player who plays as a forward.

References

External links

2000 births
Living people
Australian soccer players
Association football midfielders
South Melbourne FC players
Western United FC players
Central Coast Mariners FC players
National Premier Leagues players
A-League Men players